Chico Xavier or Francisco Cândido Xavier, born Francisco de Paula Cândido (April 2, 1910 – June 30, 2002), was a popular Brazilian philanthropist and spiritist medium. During a period of 60 years he wrote over 490 books and several thousand letters claiming to use a process known as "psychography". Books based on old letters and manuscripts were published posthumously, bringing the total number of books to 496.

The books written by Chico covered a vast range of topics from religion, philosophy, historical romances and novels, Portuguese Literature, poetry, and science, as well as thousands of letters intended to inform, console and uplift the families of deceased persons during his psychographic sessions. His books sold an estimated 50 million copies and the revenue generated by it was totally channeled into charity work.

Xavier was born in the city of Pedro Leopoldo, State of Minas Gerais and is popularly known as "Chico Xavier" (Chico is the Portuguese nickname for Francisco). Xavier called his spiritual guide Emmanuel, who according to Xavier, lived in ancient Rome as Senator Publius Lentulus, was reincarnated in Spain as Father Damien, and later as a professor at the Sorbonne.

He often mentioned he could not contact a deceased person unless the spirit was willing to be contacted. His appearances on TV talk shows in the late 1960s and early 1970s helped to establish Spiritism as one of the major religions professed in Brazil with more than 5 million followers. Despite his health problems he kept working up to his death, on June 30, 2002 in Uberaba. In 2010, a movie biography entitled Chico Xavier was released in Brazil. Directed by Daniel Filho, the film dramatized Xavier's life.

On October 3, 2012, the SBT television TV show O Maior Brasileiro de Todos os Tempos named Chico Xavier "The Greatest Brazilian of all time", based on a viewer-supported survey.

Biography

Childhood 

He was the son of João Cândido Xavier who was a lottery ticket vendor, and Maria João de Deus, a Catholic housewife. According to biographers, his mediunity first appeared when he was only four years old. His father was talking to a lady about pregnancy and he began stating facts about sciences. He claimed he could hear and see spirits. His mother died when he was 5 years old. He claimed to talk with his mother's spirit for some years. People thought that he was crazy for several years because he talked with spirits.

Francisco's father got married again, Cidália Batista the second wife, demanded that the father should gather the nine children once for all. Francisco was then, seven years old. The couple had yet, six more children. Francisco was enrolled in a public school. Within this period, the spirit of his mother stopped making contact with him. Francisco, started to work very young in order to help with the expenses at home, he would sell vegetables produced at home.

At school, as well as in church, Francisco's claimed paranormal power constantly would put him into trouble. Once, while in his fourth year of primary school, he claimed to have seen a man who had dictated all his school essays, but no one seemed to pay him any attention; and not even the teacher seemed to care about it. One of his memorial school compositions on the centenary of the independence of Brazil won an honorable mention in a state contest. In 1922 he faced skepticism from colleagues and friends, who accused him of plagiarism; such accusations lasted all his life. Challenged to prove his gifts, Francisco was submitted to the challenge of improvising an essay (with the help of a spirit) about sand grain: the topic was thought up without preparation and at that very moment, and he succeeded.

Cidália, his step mother, asked Francisco to ask the spirit of his late mother about how to prevent the neighbor from stealing her vegetables, and the spirit said; put her in charge of the kitchen garden, the advice was followed and brought an end to the vanishing vegetables. Scared about the mediunity of the young boy, his father decided to hospitalize him.

Father Scarzelli; the Catholic priest examined him, and concluded that hospitalizing the boy would be a mistake, since it was only "children's fantasy". Scarzelli simply advised the family to restrict his reading (he believed they were the reason for the fantasies) and put him to work; Francisco then was hired to work in a textile factory where he was submitted to rigorous discipline of extended working hours.  That brought serious consequences that lasted for the rest of his life.

In 1924, he finished primary school and never went back to school. He was hired as a sales clerk working long hours.  Despite his Catholic devotion and uncountable penances, along with all the restrictions imposed by the priest he confessed with, he never stopped having visions or communicating with spirits.

Contact with Spiritism 

In May 1927 his sister, Maria Xavier, was having mental disturbances, which many believed was caused by spiritual sources known as obsession (Spiritism). This episode allowed Francisco to support his sister with his mediumship capacities and introduced him to the Spiritism Doctrine as well. Simultaneously he allegedly received a new message from his mother in which she recommended him to accomplish all his duties and thoroughly study the books of Allan Kardec; In June; Francisco founded the Spiritist Center Luiz Gonzaga, in a wooden warehouse owned by his brother. In July, under the guidance of a so-called "benevolent spirit", he started to psychograph, writing seventeen pages.

Later, Xavier would claim that several deceased Poets had begun to manifest themselves through him, but they only started to identify themselves in 1931. In 1928, he published his first psychographic messages in the newspapers "O Jornal", from Rio de Janeiro, and Almanaque de Notícias, from Portugal.

First works 

He became widely known in Brazil in 1931, when he published the book Parnassus Beyond the Tomb, which had 259 poems allegedly composed by 56 deceased Brazilian and Portuguese illustrious Poets.That year was marked by the medium's "adulthood" and when he firstly met his spiritual Mentor Emmanuel, "Under a tree, near a water reservoir..." (SOUTO MAIOR, 1995:31). According to Chico his Mentor informed about his mission to psychograph a sequence of thirty books and to achieve such a task he would require 3 mandatory conditions: "discipline, discipline and discipline". Emmanuel instructed him to be loyal to Jesus and Kardec, even if it was against his religious basis. Later on, the Medium found out that Emmanuel had been the Roman senator Publius Lentulus, further reborn as a slave who sympathized with Christianity, still in another reincarnation, had been a Jesuit priest Manuel da Nóbrega, involved with the gospel teachings during the colonial period of Brazil in the 18th century.

In 1932, the book Parnaso de Além-Túmulo, was then published by; Federação Espírita Brasileira (FEB). (Brazilian Spiritualist Federation) The compilation of poetry dictated by spirits of Brazilian and Portuguese poets achieved enormous impact in the Brazilian press and public opinion, and yet caused strong polemic among the ones involved with Brazilian literature, whose opinions were divided between recognition and accusations of pastiche. The impact increased even more when it was revealed that the books had been written by a "humble clerk" from a warehouse in the countryside of Minas Gerais (Brazilian state where the medium was born), who had barely finished primary school. It is said that the spirit of his mother advised him not to respond to the criticism.

The copyrights of all his books were kindly granted to FEB. At that period, he started a relationship with Manuel Quintão and Wantuil de Freitas. Still at the same period, an ocular cataract was found, problem which he had to live with for the rest of his life. The spirits and his mentors, Emmanuel and Bezerra de Menezes, instructed him to be treated with the resources of human medicine and told him not to count on any kind of privileges from the spirits.

He kept working as a clerk–typist at the model farm from the Regional Inspectorate of the Department of Livestock Development, He started to perform at Centro Espírita Luís Gonzaga in 1935, helping the ones in need with prescriptions, advice and producing psychographic books. The farm manager and agronomist Rômulo Joviano, also spiritist who attended all the seances at Centro Luiz Gonzaga, where he later became the president., besides giving Francisco a job, he also cooperated with the medium, by allowing him some free time to find the necessary peace to execute his psychographic works, It was in a period that Francisco was using the basement of Joviano's house to perform his psychographic works, when one of his most remarkable books, titled Paulo e Estevão (Paul and Stevan) came out. At the same time; a long refusal of gifts and honors started and lasted all his life, as an example: Fred Figner granted Francisco a huge amount of money in his will; which was promptly granted to FEB; by the medium.

As well as notoriety, the criticism from people who tried to discredit him strongly persisted. Chico Xavier said that also spiritual foes tried to involve him into negative fluids and temptations, apart from all living people,. Souto Maior (Brazilian journalist) reports an attempted of "lynching by spirits", as well as an episode which naked girls tried to seduce the medium in his bathtub. Note that; in both episodes there are common narrative aspects to the other proofs, commonly mentioned in stories of holiness.

Lawsuit from the widow of Humberto de Campos 

During 1930, the publishing of the romances attributed to Emmanuel and the book Brasil, Coração do Mundo, Pátria do Evangelho, attributed to the spirit of Humberto de Campos were highlighted; in which the story of Brazil is interpreted in a mythical and theological way. As consequence; the last book mentioned here brought him a lawsuit from the widow of Humberto de Campos, who pleaded for the psychographed books copyrights, in case the legitimacy of the famous author from Maranhão (A state of Brazil) was proven.

The medium's defense was supported by FEB, further resulting in the classic A Psicografia Perante os Tribunais, (the psychography in the view of court) written by the lawyer Miguel Timponi. along the trial; the judge decided that books copyrights refer to books recognized while the author is alive; since it would be impossible for the court to prove the existence of mediunity. Even so; in order to avoid problems in the future, the spiritual writer's name was substituted by the nickname "Irmão X" (Brother X).

At that time, Francisco was hired by the federal public service, as a helper at Ministério da Agricultura (Ministry of Agriculture). It is important to highlight that; along his career as a public worker; there is no record of any absence from work.

Nosso Lar 

In 1943, one of the most popular books in Brazilian spiritist literature was published, the novel titled Nosso Lar, the best seller and most disclosed from the medium's extensive psychographic writings; which became a movie of the same name in 2010.

This is the first book from a series whose authorship is attributed to the spirit of André Luis. During that time, the fame of Chico Xavier (Francisco's nickname) was increasing, more and more people looked for him in search of healing and messages, transforming the small town of Pedro Leopoldo into an informal center of pilgrimage. Francisco's former boss José Felizardo died very poor, the medium then, strived to get him a decent funeral; he went on around the town asking for donations; knocking on every one's door to collect money for the burial. According to Francisco's biographer Ubiratan Machado, "...even a blind homeless man donated the donations he had collected that day". (MACHADO, 1996:53).

The case Amauri Pena 

In 1958, the Medium was involved in a controversial case due to the accusations coming from his nephew, Amauri Pena, son of Francisco's sister. The nephew was psychographic Medium and announced to the press to be a fraud, a very capable impostor, extending his declaration to his uncle Xavier. Chico denied any wrongdoing and any proximity or involvement with the nephew. Later remorseful by the damage he caused to his uncle's reputation he asked for forgiveness and dropping all the accusations he previously made. Amauri was then hospitalized in a mental hospital in São Paulo, where he eventually died at age 27.

The case Davi Nasser and Jean Manzon 

In 1944 Journalists David Nasser and Jean Manzon made an unfriendly report of the Medium, which was published at "O Cruzeiro" magazine. The Reporters pretended to be foreigners using false names in order to test whether Chico was a fraud; Later when Nasser and Manzon arrived home after the interview, they were surprised to look in books Xavier had given them as gifts, as reported by Nasser in an interview with TV Cultura in 1980: "At dawn, Manzon called me and said, 'Have you seen the book that Chico Xavier gave to us?'. I said no. 'Well, you see,' he said. I was in my library, I picked up the book and written there was this: 'To my brother David Nasser, Emmanuel'. He had made a similar dedication to Manzon.  It is things like that make me very afraid to get involved in Spiritism issues."

Partnership with Waldo Vieira 

At that time, Chico Xavier met the young student of Medicine and medium Waldo Vieira; together they psychographed several books; until their abruption some years later. In 1959, Francisco moved to Uberaba, where he lived until the end of his days. He continued psychographing several books, approaching topics that were priority in the 60's; such as, sex, drugs, youth issues, technology, space travels among others. Uberaba then, became an informal center of pilgrimage, with thousands of people arriving every day; people hoping to make contact with deceased relatives. At that time; books of "messages" became popular; letters dictated by spirits of regular people to their family members; proceeding as well with constant campaigns of food and clothing distribution to the poor people around the town.

On May 22 of 1965; Chico Xavier and Waldo Vieira travelled to the US in order to disclose spiritism abroad; with the help of Salim Salomão Haddad, president of Christian Spirit Center, and his wife Phillis, they studied English and launched the book titled The World of The Spirits (Ideal Espírita; Portuguese version).

Interviews on the television show Pinga-Fogo 

In the beginning of 1970; Chico took part on the popular nationwide interview TV program called "Pinga Fogo" (Dripping Fire) which reached extremely high levels of audience throughout the country. In the same year; besides the cataract and lungs problems, Francisco developed a heart condition called angina. In 1975 he founded the spiritst centre "Casa da Prece" in Uberaba.

The 1980s and '90s 

At that time, his fame extended to other parts of the world, with several books translated into other languages, as well as adaptations for soap operas versions. By the end of 1990, the medium had already psychographed more than four hundreds books. At that time; it was estimated that approximately fifty millions of spiritist books were circulating in Brazil, from which; fifteen million of them were attributed to Chico Xavier and twelve millions to Kardec (SANTOS, 1997:89).

In 1994, the American tabloid National Examiner published an article saying, "Ghost writers make novelist a millionaire" The article was vaunted in Brazil by the extinct news magazine; revista Manchete, titled as Secretary of Ghosts, where it said that, according to National Examiner information; the Brazilian medium had made twenty million dollars as a "Secretary of Ghosts".
Manchete magazine proceeded saying: "According to the newspapers, he is the first one to have admitted that the 380 books he had produced were by 'ghost-writers', "literally ghosts'", concluding that; Chico simply transcribes psychographed books through more than 500 deceased and buried writers and poets.

The medium; did not respond to the attacks, but FEB, publisher of most of Chico's books; through its then president Juvanir Borges de Souza sent a letter to the magazine; informing them that; all copyrights and remuneration from Francisco Cândido Xavier's books had been granted to charity; and that the same procedure was being performed with other publishers as well, yet; emphasizing that "the copyrights are granted absolutely for free, in order to make the books affordable enough, and as well contribute to the disclosure of the Spiritist Doctrine".

The same president of FEB, on October 4 of the same year; during the first Worldwide Spiritist Congress, presented a "vote of recognition and appreciation to the medium Francisco Cândido Xavier", approved by the FEB National Federative Council, under a proposal presented by the president of Federação Espírita do Estado de Sergipe. (Spiritist Federation from the state of Sergipe) In the document; the entities representing the spiritism in Brazil devoted their gratitude and respect for the medium "for his intense and extended works, for the example of life dedicated to studies and fraternity, disclosure and practices of spiritism, for the spiritual and material guidelines, assistance and help to the neighbor".

Death 
Xavier died due to a cardiorespiratory arrest on 30 June 2002, at the age of 92. According to friends and close relatives, Chico had asked God to take him away in a day which all Brazilian people were very happy and the country under some kind of celebration; this way, no one would be sad with his departure. On the day of his death, the country was celebrating the conquest of the 2002 FIFA World Cup, (Chico died around nine hours after the game Brazil x Germany).

Tributes 
In 1981, appointed for the Nobel Peace Prize, when his name gathered 2 million signatures for submission. However, The Nobel Peace Prize 1981 was awarded to Office of the United Nations High Commissioner for Refugees.
In 1999, the Government of the State of Minas Gerais established the "Commendation of Peace Chico Xavier", award which is annually awarded to individuals or legal entities who work for peace and social well-being.

In 2000, Chico was elected the "Mineiro" from the 20th century, ("Mineiro" is the name given to people born in the state of Minas Gerais; Brazil) followed by Alberto Santos-Dumont (founder of the aviation in Brazil) and Juscelino Kubitschek (President of Brazil 1956 – 1961 and founder of Brasilia); in a contest performed by Rede Globo Minas, (Rede Globo Minas; TV station from the state of Minas Gerais) with 704.030 votes.

After Chico Xavier died, the house where he lived between 1948 and 1959 and the house he lived in between 1959 and 2002 were transformed into non-profit museums in reference to his life and work; and the interior of Pedro Leopoldo's Modelo Farm, where he worked as a typist between 1930 and the late 1950s, was also transformed into a memorial in his honor.

In 2006, he was elected the "History's greatest Brazilian", in a contest performed by Época magazine.

In 2009, the Brazilian Government gave the name "Chico Xavier" for a passage of an important highway of the country, BR-050.

In 2010, his centenary has been marked by numerous celebrations in Brazil, like two feature films and a special postage stamp.

The city of Uberaba (Town where Chico lived) recently started the construction of a memorial in his honor.

In 2012, on the TV show "O Maior Brasileiro de Todos os Tempos" (The greatest Brazilian of all times), broadcast by SBT (Brazilian Television Channel), he was elected by popular votes, as one of the 12 greatest Brazilian citizens of all times; this way; he went on to the next step (02/08/2012), disputing against Irmã Dulce (catholic nun) on a knockout stage, he was elected by 50.5% of the votes. On the semifinal of the program he disputed against Ayrton Senna, (Brazilian Formula 1 racer) receiving 63.8% of the votes. At the end of the program, Chico competed against Alberto Santos-Dumont (founder of the aviation in Brazil) and Princess Isabel (responsible for the abolition of slavery in Brazil); but, he had been the one elected to become "the greatest Brazilian of all times" with 71.4% of the votes.

In 2016, the Chico Xavier Memorial was inaugurated in Uberaba, built in collaboration between the Chico Xavier Institute and the city hall.

On October 29, 2020, a life-size bronze statue of Xavier was inaugurated at Praça Rui Barbosa, in Uberaba. It was made by visual artist Vânia Braga.

Through Law 14.201 of 2021, Francisco Candido Xavier had his name inscribed in Livro dos Heróis e Heroínas da Pátria (the Book of Heroes and Heroines of the Fatherland), a document that preserves the names of figures who marked the history of Brazil and is found in the Tancredo Neves Pantheon of the Fatherland and Freedom, in Brasilia.

Biographic movie 

In April 2010, date which Chico Xavier would turn 100 years old, the film "Chico Xavier" was released. It is based on the biography titled "As Vidas de Chico Xavier" (The lives of Chico Xavier), by journalist Marcel Souto Maior, and it was directed and produced by filmmaker Daniel Filho. Chico Xavier is portrayed by actors Matheus Costa, Ângelo Antônio and Nelson Xavier, respectively during three phases of his life: from 1918 to 1922, 1931 to 1959 and 1969 to 1975.

Skeptical reception

In 2010, Kentaro Mori published an article in the Skeptical Inquirer which accused Xavier of fraud. According to Mori the staff at his Spiritist Center in Brazil would help him by gathering information about his clients and faking psychic letters. He was also accused of using perfume in the séance room which was a common Spiritualist trick to pretend the scent was of supernatural origin. The skeptic Karen Stollznow has also accused Xavier of hot reading.

Psychographic works 

Chico Xavier wrote most of 450 allegedly psychographic books. He never admitted to be the author of any of his books. He affirmed he would only reproduce whatever the spirits dictated to him. Being the reason for why he would never accept the money attained from selling his books. He sold more than 50 million copies in Portuguese; with translations in English, Spanish, Japanese, Esperanto, French, German, Italian, Russian, Romanian, Mandarin, Swedish, Braille, and other languages. He also transcribed around ten thousand letters allegedly from the dead to their families. The letters were declared legitimate by many people, and some of the letters were used as evidence in four criminal trials. Chico Xavier granted all the copyrights to charity institution since the first book.

His works are published by Centro Espírita União, Casa Editora O Clarim, Edicel, Federação Espírita Brasileira, Federação Espírita do Estado de São Paulo, Federação Espírita do Rio Grande do Sul, Fundação Marieta Gaio, Grupo Espírita Emmanuel s/c Editora, Comunhão Espírita Cristã, Instituto de Difusão Espírita, Instituto de Divulgação Espírita André Luiz, Livraria Allan Kardec Editora, Editora Pensamento, Editora Vinha de Luz and União Espírita Mineira. Even though he hadn't finished primary high school, he would write around six books a year, among romances, tales, philosophy, rehearsals, apologues, chronics, poems, etc. He is the most read author from Latin America (note: year of 2010).

His first books, Parnaso de Além-Túmulo, containing 256 poems attributed to deceased poets, among them, two being the Portuguese João de Deus, Antero de Quental and Guerra Junqueiro and the Brazilians Olavo Bilac, Cruz e Sousa and Augusto dos Anjos, was published for the first time in 1932; the book caused strong admiration and controversy among the literary circle from that time. Among other books, Nosso Lar was the one with the largest circulation, it was first published in 1944, which sold more than two million copies, attributed to the spirit of André Luiz, it was the first volume out of a collection composed by seventeen books, all of them psychographed by Chico Xavier, some of them in partnership with medium Doctor Waldo Vieira.

A very remarkable psychography which circulated worldwide, was about a case from "Goiania" (a Brazilian city), in which José Divino Nunes, accused of murdering his best friend Maurício Henriques, was cleared from the accusation by a judge who accepted the psychography as a valid proof (among other proofs presented by the defense); a testimony from the victim himself already dead, through a psychographed letter dictated to Chico Xavier. The case took place in October 1979, in the city of Goiânia, Goiás. Thus; the supposed spirit of Maurício, freed his best friend from the accusation of murder claiming that it had been an accident.

Through the decades, Chico produced thousands of psychographed letters for desperate parents and mothers who came to him in order to receive messages from their deceased sons and daughters. According to a survey from 1990, performed by the Spiritist Medical Association of São Paulo, the letters always contained much informations that was somehow familiar to the readers for whom the letters were intended, and 35 per cent of them carried an identical signature to the signature of the deceased.

One electroencephalogram study conducted during a mediumnistic trance by Dr. Elias Barbosa, Chico Xavier's family doctor, was reported by "Revista Planeta", a popular news magazine, in June 1973. It was suggested that Chico presented common characteristics of epilepsy, even though he was never epileptic, with claims that his brain activity was somehow "paranormal". Many years later, in February 2010, Dr. Guilherme Gustavo Riccioppo Rodrigues reviewed Barbosa's EEG study and found "no evidence to suggest clinical abnormality, let alone to support the idea that his brain is paranormal".

In 2013, Brazilian scientists compared recent medical knowledge with twelve psychographed works by Chico Xavier attributed to André Luiz, identifying in them several highly complex correct information about the physiology of the pineal gland that could only be scientifically confirmed 60 years after the works were published in the scientific journal Neuroendocrinology Letters. The scientists pointed out that the fact that the medium had a low level of education and was not involved in the health field raises profound questions about whether or not the works were the result of spiritual communication.

Main psychographies

See also 
 Eurípedes Barsanulfo
 Divaldo Pereira Franco

References

External links
 Aguarde... World Spiritist Board
 TVCEI – A sua TV Espirita Spiritist TV
 Portal Luz Espirita – Spiritisme Spiritist Doctrine Portal Luz Espírita in English
 Portal Luz Espírita – estudo e divulgação do Espiritismo – Doutrina Espírita Portal Luz Espírita in Portuguese
 FEB – Federação Espírita Brasileira Spirit Federation of Brazil

1910 births
2002 deaths
People from Pedro Leopoldo
20th-century Brazilian male writers
20th-century Brazilian writers
Spiritism
Brazilian philanthropists
Brazilian spiritual mediums
Brazilian spiritual writers
Brazilian spiritualists
20th-century philanthropists